List of Malaysian patriotic songs

National
 "Negaraku" (National anthem)
 "Jalur Gemilang" (Flag anthem)
 "Malaysiaku Gemilang" ("Glory of My Malaysia" - The Anthem for the 50th Merdeka Day)
 "Perpaduan Teras Kejayaan" ("Unity Is The Core of Success" - The Anthem for the 51st Merdeka Day)
 "Satu Malaysia" ("One Malaysia" - The Anthem for the 52nd Merdeka Day)
 "Malaysiaku Berdaulat Tanah Tumpahnya Darahku" ("My Sovereign Malaysia, My Native Land") - The Anthem for the 56th Merdeka Day)
 "Malaysia, Disini Lahirnya Sebuah Cinta" ("Malaysia, Where the Love Is Born" - The Anthem for the 57th Merdeka Day)
 "Sehati Sejiwa" (The Anthem for the 58th Merdeka Day)
 "Kita Satu Malaysia"  ("We Are One Malaysia")
 "Gemilangku Malaysia" ("Malaysia Our Glory")
 "Benderaku" ("Our Flag")
 "Setia Malaysia" (Loyal Malaysia)
 "Keranamu Malaysia" ("For You Malaysia") by Abang Lan
 "Setia" ("Loyal") - by Dato Ahmad Dassilah. 
 "Rukun Negara" (Ideology songs)
 "Perajurit Tanah Air" aka "Inilah Barisan Kita" ("This is Our Team")
 "Malaysia Berjaya" ("Malaysia Success")
 "Pahlawanku" ("Our Ranger") - by Siti Nurhaliza
 "Warna-Warna Malaysiaku" - by Siti Nurhaliza
 "Satu Malaysia" ("One Malaysia") - by Siti Nurhaliza
 "Budi Bahasa Budaya Kita" - by Siti Nurhaliza
 "Hati" - by Siti Nurhaliza from the film 1957 Hati Malaya
 "Berkorban Apa Sahaja" ("Do Anything") - by P. Ramlee from the film Hang Tuah
 "Perwira"  ("Super") - by Saloma
 "Zapin Malaysia" - by P. Ramlee and Saloma
 "Joget Malaysia" - by P. Ramlee and Saloma
 "Sekapur Sirih Seulas Pinang" - by Saloma
 "Bahtera Merdeka" - by Aishah
 "Bumi Bertuah, Malaysia" - by Jamal Abdillah
 "Namamu Tetap Gemilang" - by Jamal Abdillah
 "Berkorban Apa Sahaja" ("Do Anything") - by Jamal Abdillah from the film Tuah
 "Kau Pergi Demi Pertiwi" - by Jamal Abdillah
 "Takkan Melayu Hilang di Dunia" - by Sharifah Aini
 "Malaysia Indah" - by Khatijah Ibrahim
 "Sejahtera Malaysia"
 "Malaysia Oh Tanahairku " (Malaysia, Oh Our Land")
 "Selamat Pergi Pahlawanku"
 "Bumi Malaysia"
 "Tanggal 31 Ogos" (National day songs) - by Sudirman Arshad
 "Tegakkan Bendera Kita" ("Raise Our Flag") - by Sudirman Arshad
 "Di Bumi Bertuah" - by Sudirman Arshad
 "Warisan" - by Sudirman Arshad
 "Bapak" - by Sudirman Arshad (special tribute to the Father of Independence, Tunku Abdul Rahman Putra Alhaj)
 "Malaysia, Tanah Airku"
 "Malaysia Baru" ("New Malaysia")
 "Bersatu Berdisiplin"
 "Dirgahayu Oh Tanahairku"
 "Kemegahan Negaraku" (Pride of the Nation)
 "Perpaduan Bangsa"
 "Malaysia Berjaya"
 "Tanahairku"
 "Tanah Pusaka"
 "Jaya Diri"
 "Berjaya"
 "Cemerlang, Gemilang, Terbilang"
 "Wawasan 2020" ("Vision 2020")
 "Gagah Perkasa"
 "Si Baju Hijau" ("The Man in Green") - by Carefree
 "Di Medan Ini" - by Awie
 "Tanda" - by Awie
 "Gemilang" - by Ella
 "Standing in the Eyes of the World" - by Ella
 "Redha Kemenangan" - by Amy Search
 "Malaysiaku Tercinta"
 "Sehati Sejiwa Malaysia"
 "Cinta Setia"
 "Permainya Bumi Malaysia"
 "Perjuangan Yang Belum Selesai" - poem songs by Nora
 "Malaysia Boleh!"
 "Kami Anak Malaysia" aka "Proud To Be Malaysian" - both Malay and English version
 "Untukmu Malaysia "For You Malaysia"
 "Mulanya Di Sini" ("It All Starts Here") - by Freedom
 "Here in My Home" - by Malaysian Artists for Unity (MAFU), May 2008. An anti-racism song project preceded 15Malaysia film project.
 "Malaysia Satu" - by Faizal Tahir (Winner of "Our 1 Malaysia Song" competition)
 "Saya Anak Malaysia"
 "Fikirkan Boleh" - by Metropolitan
 "Malaysia Forever" - by Bobby Gimby
 "Luhur" by Kamikaze
 "Bersatu" by Raihan
 "Kita Punya Malaysia" ("This is Our Malaysia") by Bunkface
 "Malaysia Bersih" ("A Clean Malaysia") by Syamel and Ernie Zakri

States

Johor
 "Lagu Bangsa Johor" (State anthem)
 "Tanjung Puteri"
 "Johor Negeriku"
 "Selat Tebrau"

Kedah
 "Allah Selamatkan Sultan Mahkota" (State anthem)
 "Jelapang Padi Kedah"
 "Mai Cek Oi Mai Cek Mai"

Kelantan
 "Selamat Sultan" (State anthem)

Melaka
 "Melaka Maju Jaya" (State anthem)

Negeri Sembilan
 "Berkatlah Yang DiPertuan Besar Negeri Sembilan" (State anthem)

Pahang
 "Lagu Negeri Pahang" (State anthem)
 "Pahang"
 "Sejahtera Pahang" Komposer Joe Chelliah
 "Pertiwi Ku Pahang Darul Makmur" Komposer Joe Chelliah

Penang
 "Untuk Negeri Kita" (State anthem)
 "Sila Berkunjung Ke Pulau Pinang"

Perak
 "Allah Lanjutkan Usia Sultan" (State anthem)
 "Perak Darul Ridzuan" aka "Perak Oh Negeriku"

Perlis
 "Amin amin ya Rabaljalil" (State anthem)
 "Kuala Perlis"

Sabah
 "Sabah Tanah Airku" (State anthem)

Sarawak
 "Ibu Pertiwiku" (State anthem)
 "Sarawak, namamu"
 "Sarawak ke alaf baru"
 "Puteri Santubong"

Selangor
 "Duli Yang Maha Mulia" (State anthem)
 "Selangor Bergerak Maju"
 "Keroncong Selangor"

Terengganu
 "Lagu Negeri Terengganu" (State anthem)

Wilayah Persekutuan (Federal Territory)
 "Maju dan Sejahtera" (Territory anthem)

Kuala Lumpur
 "Selamatkan Kuala Lumpur" (Territory anthem)
 "Kuala Lumpur, Kuala Lumpur"
 "Keroncong Kuala Lumpur" - by P. Ramlee
 "Kuala Lumpur, Ibu Negeri" -  by Saloma

Labuan
 "Labuan Negeriku" (Territory anthem)

Putrajaya